Neoplecostomus paranensis is a species of armored catfish endemic to Brazil where it is found in the upper Paraná River basin.  This species grows to a length of  SL.

References
 

paranensis
Fish of South America
Fish of Brazil
Endemic fauna of Brazil
Taxa named by Francisco Langeani-Neto
Fish described in 1990